The Irani Papel e Embalagem is a Brazilian pulp and paper company that was founded in 1941, by families of the State of Rio Grande do Sul – Brazil.

At that time, in order to provide infrastructure for the company project, they also built a Village so the workers could live closer to the plant. It was settled in Campina da Alegria, a district within the City of Vargem Bonita, State of Santa Catarina - Brazil. Nowadays, the city holds approximately 1.300 inhabitants, most of them directly or indirectly related to IRANI.

In 1994, Habitasul Grupo took over and the company was restructured. Today, IRANI produces from seeds to wood, paper, packaging and furniture.

Divisions

Currently, Irani have the following business divisions: Paper, Packaging, Resins and Forest Division, which are situated in the following locations: Vargem Bonita (State of Santa Catarina), Indaiatuba (State of São Paulo), Balneário Pinhal (State of Rio Grande do Sul) and São José do Norte (State of Rio Grande do Sul). The company offices are in Porto Alegre (State of Rio Grande do Sul) and in Joaçaba (State of Santa Catarina).

International Subsidiaries

Recently, Irani Papel e Embalagem launched a furniture brand for the North American Market, called Brastilo, besides bringing to the consumer the Brazilian design and quality, the brand, since its start, is using the concept of being Eco-Friendly.

Competitors
Suzano Papel e Celulose
Klabin
Fibria
Melpaper S.A.

External links and references

- Irani Official Website
- Meu Movel de Madeira (Brand in Brazil and for Export)

Pulp and paper companies of Brazil
Companies listed on B3 (stock exchange)
Companies based in Rio Grande do Sul
Economy of Porto Alegre